The 2013 3 Hours of Red Bull Ring was an auto racing event held at the Red Bull Ring in Spielberg, Styria, Austria on 19–20 July 2013.  It was the third round of the 2013 European Le Mans Series season, and the series' first visit to the Red Bull Ring.  Thiriet by TDS Racing, with drivers Pierre Thiriet and Mathias Beche, won the race over Signatech Alpine, while the LMPC category was led by Paul-Loup Chatin and Gary Hirsch.  Ram Racing's Matt Griffin and Johnny Mowlem led the LMGTE category, while Fabio Babini, Kirill Ladygin, and Viktor Shaitar of SMP Racing won the GTC class.

Qualifying

Qualifying result
Pole position winners in each class are marked in bold.

 – The No. 36 Signatech Oreca-Nissan had its qualifying times nullified after it set its fastest qualifying lap while a sector of the track was under yellow flag conditions.  The team was allowed to start from the back of the LMP2 class grid.

Race

Race result
Class winners in bold.  Cars failing to complete 70% of winner's distance marked as Not Classified (NC).

References

Red Bull Ring
Red Bull Ring